Agustín González Tapia (born 30 January 1983) is an Argentine footballer who plays as a midfielder for Spanish club UD Barbastro.

Career
He began his career with Estudiantes de la Plata making his professional debut in a 1-1 draw against Lanús on 3 March 2002. Since then he has played for several clubs in the lower leagues of Argentine football and in Europe with Albanian side Dinamo Tirana.

External links
 Profile at En Una Baldosa 
 
 
 

1983 births
Living people
Argentine footballers
Argentine expatriate footballers
Footballers from La Plata
FK Dinamo Tirana players
Estudiantes de La Plata footballers
Defensa y Justicia footballers
San Martín de San Juan footballers
La Plata FC footballers
Guillermo Brown footballers
Atlético de Rafaela footballers
Sportivo Belgrano footballers
Central Córdoba de Santiago del Estero footballers
Unión La Calera footballers
UD Barbastro players
Torneo Argentino A players
Torneo Argentino B players
Torneo Federal A players
Primera Nacional players
Chilean Primera División players
Tercera División players
Expatriate footballers in Albania
Argentine expatriate sportspeople in Albania
Expatriate footballers in Chile
Argentine expatriate sportspeople in Chile
Expatriate footballers in Spain
Argentine expatriate sportspeople in Spain
Association football midfielders